Antanas Augustinas Vaičiulaitis (1906–1992) was a Lithuanian fiction writer of the 20th century, and also known for his literary criticism and translations. His most prominent work is the novel Valentina.

Biography
A Vaičiulaitis was born on June 23, 1906 in Didieji Šelviai, near Vilkaviškis, in the Suvalkija region, then part of Congress Poland. He attended a primary school in Vilkaviškis, and in 1919–1927, he attended Žiburys high school also in Vilkaviškis. His poetry was first published in 1925 in the journal Krivulė.   In 1927, he enrolled at the University of Lithuania in Kaunas, where he studied Lithuanian and French languages and literature.  After finishing his studies at the university, for a short while he taught at the Kaunas Jesuit school. From 1935–1938, he enrolled in advanced studies of French literature at the University of Grenoble and at the Sorbonne. Returning to Kaunas, from 1938–1940, he worked at the news service ELTA and taught new Lithuanian literature in the Theology and Philosophy Department at Vytautas Magnus University. He traveled frequently to Europe. 

In 1940, Vaičiulaitis was appointed to diplomatic service at the Lithuanian Embassy in Rome,  and then emigrated to the United States. In 1941–1945, he taught at the Marianapolis Preparatory School. In 1943, he joined the U.S. Army Air Force, and for health reasons received an honorable discharge. In 1945–1947 he edited the journal Amerika and from 1947–1951 taught French language at the University of Scranton.  In 1951, Vaičiulaitis began work for the United States Information Agency (USIA), for the Lithuanian service of the Voice of America, from which he retired in 1976.  He died on July 22, 1992 in Washington, D.C.

Works 

Vakaras sargo namely: (short stories) - 1932, 1944, 1976, 2006
Vidudienis kaimo smuklėj: (short stories) - 1933
Mūsų mažoji sesuo - 1936, 1970
Valentina: (novel) - 1936, 1951, 1992
Natūralizmas ir lietuvių literatūra - 1936
Nuo Sirakūzų lig Šiaurės elnio: (travel writing) - 1937, 2014 
Pelkių takas: (short stories) - 1939
Outline history of Lithuanian literature: (essays) - 1942
La Literatura, Guardian de la Nation: (essays)- 1943 
Kur bakužė samanota: (historical fiction) - 1947
Italijos vaizdai: (travel writing) - 1949, 2015 
Pasakojimai: (short story collection). - 1955
Auksinė kurpelė: (folk tale collection). - 1957
Noon at a country inn: (short story collection) / English translation by A.Baranauskas & others 1965
Gluosnių daina: (legends) - 1966
Apaštalų iškeliavimas -  1970
Ir atlėkė volungė: (poetry) - 1980
Vidurnaktis prie Šeimenos: (short stories) -1986
Pasakos:  (folk tale collection) -  1989
Tavo veido šviesa: (short stories, legends, novel collection) -  1989
Knygos ir žmonės: (essay collection) -  1992
Popiežiaus paukštė: (short story collection) - 1996

References 
 LMS IC:  Classic Lithuanian Literature Anthology
 Antologija - Classic Lithuanian Literature Anthology
 Virginija Paplauskienė, 2006, Antanas Vaičiulaitis: Archyvai, Kaunas: Maironio lietuvių literatūros muziejus.

Further reading 

1906 births
1992 deaths
Lithuanian diplomats
Lithuanian emigrants to the United States
20th-century Lithuanian writers
Vytautas Magnus University alumni